Amit Ravindernath Sharma is an Indian director and producer working predominantly as a director of television commercials.

In feature films, he is best known for the 2018 film Badhaai Ho, which was one of the highest grossing Bollywood films of 2018, having earned ₹220.34 crore ($31 million) as of December 2018.

Biography

Early life and career 
Sharma was born in Delhi, India to parents who worked for the government. While still in school, he connected with film director Pradeep Sarkar, and was invited to shoot an advert in Manali. After graduating, he worked with Sarkar for six years before moving to Mumbai in 2001.

Two years later, he left the tutorship of Sarkar, and in 2004 he set up his own company, Chrome Pictures, with Aleya Sen and Hemant Bhandari. Later that year, he was offered an assistant role on Sarkar's film, Parineeta, which he turned down.

Advertising 
Between 2005 and 2015, Sharma directed over 900 advertisements, including those for Google, Coca-Cola and Amazon.

In 2011, he directed an advert entitled 'The Silent National Anthem' featured deaf and mute 'singing' the Jana Gana Mana through sign language, and won a silver award at the Cannes Lions International Festival of Creativity. A 2013 advert for Lifebuoy focused on hygiene in Indian villages, and won Gold at the Spikes Asia awards later that year.

The most well-known advert he directed is perhaps the Google Reunion advert from November 2013, which told the fictional story about the reunion of two elderly men, one from India and one from Pakistan, who were childhood friends but were separated as children during the Partition of India. The ad had a strong impact in both countries, leading to hopes that travel restrictions between the two countries might be eased, and the video garnered over 1.6 million views on YouTube before debuting on television.

His work during this time was described by The Economic Times as a "contemporary greatest hits of Indian advertising".

Early film career and breakthrough 
In 2014, Sharma was invited by producer Boney Kapoor to direct Tevar, a remake of the 2003 Telugu film Okkadu, starring Arjun Kapoor. The film generally received poor reviews.

In 2016, Sharma was elected on the Cannes Lions Craft Jury.

Sharma worked as the director on Badhaai Ho, which began shooting in late 2017, and starred Ayushmann Khurrana and Neena Gupta. Sharma's production company Chrome Pictures produced the film alongside Junglee Pictures, and it was released on 18 October 2018. The film became the seventh-highest opening weekend grosser of 2018, and earned ₹220.34 crore ($31 million) worldwide.

Sharma was set to direct an upcoming film about the life and career of Syed Abdul Rahim, also produced by Boney Kapoor. The filming started in 2019, but was delayed due to the pandemic. The film featuring music by A. R. Rahman is currently in post-production.

Filmography

Awards 

 2011 Cannes Lions International Festival of Creativity – Silver ('The Silent National Anthem')
 2013 Spikes Asia – Gold ('Help A Child Reach 5', for Lifebuoy)
 National Film Award for Best Film Popular Providing Wholesome Entertainment - Badhaai Ho

References

External links

Indian art directors
Living people
21st-century Indian film directors
Hindi-language film directors
Indian advertising directors
Film directors from Delhi
Year of birth missing (living people)
Directors who won the Best Popular Film Providing Wholesome Entertainment National Film Award